Phani Sarma (1910–1970) was an Indian theatre actor, playwright, film actor and director. Beginning as a stage actor, he appeared in the first film ever made in Assamese cinema, Joymati, in 1935. Sarma was conferred with the title "Natasurya" for his contribution towards Assamese drama.

He acted in and directed Siraj in 1948 and Piyoli Phukan in 1955.

Film career
In 1933 Phani Sarma starred in the first Assamese film, Joymati, directed by Jyoti Prasad Agarwala. Sarma went on the star in Agarwalla's second picture Indramalati.

In 1955 he directed and starred in Piyoli Phukan, also playing the film's protagonist Pioli Phukan. His last film was Ito Sito Bahuto in 1963 where he appeared as an actor rather than taking the director's helm.

Playwright work
Inspired by his own experiences as an actor and the death of his son whilst stage acting, Phani Sarma wrote the social drama Kiya, a tale of an artist entertained other people with very little compensation from society. Sarma again addressed issues of isolation and corruption in his later drama Nag-Pas. However he often incorporated humour into such dramas, and the drama Kola-Bazar, he incorporated elements of comedy with more serious issues of social injustice and inequality.

Sarma also translated J. B. Priestley's famous drama An Inspector Calls into the Assamese language.

Filmography

See also
 Assamese literature
 Mahapurush Srimanta Sankardeva
 Jyoti Prasad Agarwala
 Lakshminath Bezbaruah
 Krishna Kanta Handique
 Bhabananda Deka
 Music of Assam

References

External links

 

1910 births
1970 deaths
Indian male stage actors
Indian male dramatists and playwrights
Screenwriters from Assam
Assamese-language actors
Assamese-language film directors
Film directors from Assam
Indian male film actors
People from Sonitpur district
Assamese actors
20th-century Indian dramatists and playwrights
20th-century Indian male actors
20th-century Indian male writers
20th-century Indian screenwriters